The southern tropical pewee (Contopus cinereus) is a small passerine bird in the tyrant flycatcher family.  It breeds from southern Brazil and Paraguay south to  Argentina. 

This pewee is found at the edges of forests and cultivated areas with tall trees.  The nest is a small open saucer of fibre and grasses, lined with grass and decorated with lichen on its exterior. It is placed in a tree fork or on a branch. The female builds the nest and incubates the typical clutch of two creamy-white eggs, which are marked with red-brown spots at the larger end, for 15–16 days to hatching.

The southern tropical pewee is 14 cm long and weighs 12 g. The upperparts are dark brown or grey with a blackish crown and two whitish wing bars. The throat and centre of the breast are whitish, the abdomen is pale yellow, and the sides of the flanks and breast are grey-brown. There are large variation in the overall darkness of the plumage, and especially the nominate subspecies from south-eastern Brazil and adjacent parts of Paraguay and Argentina can be very dark, almost approaching the blackish pewee in colour. The beak is short, with a black upper mandible and orange lower mandible. Sexes are similar.

Southern tropical pewees perch on a high watchpoint from which they sally forth to catch flying insects, returning to the same exposed perch.

This is a conspicuous species, with a trilled threeee call, or a sharp weet. There are, however, some geographical variations in its voice. It will defend the nest aggressively against species as large as a great kiskadee.

References

Further reading

Contopus
Birds of South America
Birds described in 1825